Saint Januarius Interceding or Saint Januarius Interceding to the Virgin Mary, Christ and God the Father for Victims of the Plague is an oil on canvas painting by Luca Giordano. It is dated to around 1656 and is now in the National Museum of Capodimonte in Naples. It was commissioned by the Spanish viceroy in Naples, Gaspare de Bracamonte, as an ex voto for the ending of a plague in the city.

References

Sources
 Luca Giordano, 1634-1705, Editrice Electa (2001) (Italian) 
 Vincenzo Pacelli, Luca Giordano inediti e considerazioni, Ediart 2007 (Italian)

1656 paintings
Paintings by Luca Giordano
Paintings of Januarius
Paintings in the collection of the Museo di Capodimonte
Epidemics in art